Ribonuclease P (RNase P) is a type of ribonuclease which cleaves RNA. RNase P is unique from other RNases in that it is a ribozyme – a ribonucleic acid that acts as a catalyst in the same way that a protein-based enzyme would. Its function is to cleave off an extra, or precursor, sequence of RNA on tRNA molecules. Further, RNase P is one of two known multiple turnover ribozymes in nature (the other being the ribosome), the discovery of which earned Sidney Altman and Thomas Cech the Nobel Prize in Chemistry in 1989: in the 1970s, Altman discovered the existence of precursor tRNA with flanking sequences and was the first to characterize RNase P and its activity in processing of the 5' leader sequence of precursor tRNA. Recent findings also reveal that RNase P has a new function. It has been shown that human nuclear RNase P is required for the normal and efficient transcription of various small noncoding RNAs, such as tRNA, 5S rRNA, SRP RNA and U6 snRNA genes, which are transcribed by RNA polymerase III, one of three major nuclear RNA polymerases in human cells.

In Bacteria
Bacterial RNase P has two components: an RNA chain, called M1 RNA, and a polypeptide chain, or protein, called C5 protein. In vivo, both components are necessary for the ribozyme to function properly, but in vitro, the M1 RNA can act alone as a catalyst. The primary role of the C5 protein is to enhance the substrate binding affinity and the catalytic rate of the M1 RNA enzyme probably by increasing the metal ion affinity in the active site. The crystal structure of a bacterial RNase P holoenzyme with tRNA has been recently resolved, showing how the large, coaxially stacked helical domains of the RNase P RNA engage in shape selective recognition of the pre-tRNA target. This crystal structure confirms earlier models of substrate recognition and catalysis, identifies the location of the active site, and shows how the protein component increases RNase P functionality.

Bacterial RNase P class A and B
Ribonuclease P (RNase P) is a ubiquitous endoribonuclease, found in archaea, bacteria and eukarya as well as chloroplasts and mitochondria. Its best characterised activity is the generation of mature 5'-ends of tRNAs by cleaving the 5'-leader elements of precursor-tRNAs. Cellular RNase Ps are ribonucleoproteins (RNP). RNA from bacterial RNase Ps retains its catalytic activity in the absence of the protein subunit, i.e. it is a ribozyme. Isolated eukaryotic and archaeal RNase P RNA has not been shown to retain its catalytic function, but is still essential for the catalytic activity of the holoenzyme. Although the archaeal and eukaryotic holoenzymes have a much greater protein content than the eubacterial ones, the RNA cores from all the three lineages are homologous—helices corresponding to P1, P2, P3, P4, and P10/11 are common to all cellular RNase P RNAs. Yet, there is considerable sequence variation, particularly among the eukaryotic RNAs.

In Archaea

In archaea, RNase P ribonucleoproteins consist of 4–5 protein subunits that are associated with RNA. As revealed by in vitro reconstitution experiments these protein subunits are individually dispensable for tRNA processing that is essentially mediated by the RNA component. The structures of protein subunits of archaeal RNase P have been resolved by x-ray crystallography and NMR, thus revealing new protein domains and folding fundamental for function.

Using comparative genomics and improved computational methods, a radically minimized form of the RNase P RNA, dubbed "Type T", has been found in all complete genomes in the crenarchaeal phylogenetic family Thermoproteaceae, including species in the genera Pyrobaculum, Caldivirga and Vulcanisaeta. All retain a conventional catalytic domain, but lack a recognizable specificity domain. 5′ tRNA processing activity of the RNA alone was experimentally confirmed. The Pyrobaculum and Caldivirga RNase P RNAs are the smallest naturally occurring form yet discovered to function as trans-acting ribozymes. Loss of the specificity domain in these RNAs suggests potential altered substrate specificity.

It has recently been argued that the archaebacteriium Nanoarchaeum equitans does not possess RNase P. Computational and experimental studies failed to find evidence for its existence. In this organism the tRNA promoter is close to the tRNA gene and it is thought that transcription starts at the first base of the tRNA thus removing the requirement for RNase P.

In eukaryotes

In eukaryotes, such as humans and yeast, most RNase P consists of an RNA chain that is structurally similar to that found in bacteria  as well as nine to ten associated proteins (as opposed to the single bacterial RNase P protein, C5). Five of these protein subunits exhibit homology to archaeal counterparts. These protein subunits of RNase P are shared with RNase MRP, a catalytic ribonucleoprotein involved in processing of ribosomal RNA in the nucleolus. RNase P from eukaryotes was only recently demonstrated to be a ribozyme. Accordingly, the numerous protein subunits of eucaryal RNase P have a minor contribution to tRNA processing per se, while they seem to be essential for the function of RNase P and RNase MRP in other biological settings, such as gene transcription and the cell cycle. Despite the bacterial origins of mitochondria and chloroplasts, plastids from higher animals and plants do not appear to contain an RNA-based RNase P. It has been shown that human mitochondrial RNase P is a protein and does not contain RNA. Spinach chloroplast RNase P has also been shown to function without an RNA subunit.

Therapies using RNase P
RNase P is now being studied as a potential therapy for diseases such as herpes simplex virus, cytomegalovirus, influenza and other respiratory infections, HIV-1 and cancer caused by fusion gene BCR-ABL. External guide sequences (EGSs) are formed with complementarity to viral or oncogenic mRNA and structures that mimic the T loop and acceptor stem of tRNA. These structures allow RNase P to recognize the EGS and cleave the target mRNA. EGS therapies have shown to be effective in culture and in live mice.

References

Further reading

External links 
 Nobel Lecture of Sidney Altman, Nobel prize in Chemistry 1989
 RNase P Database at ncsu.edu
 
 
 
 
 
 

Ribonucleases
Ribozymes
RNA splicing
EC 3.1.26
Ribonucleoproteins